Mictocommosis microctenota is a species of moth of the family Tortricidae. It is found in Sierra Leone.

References

Moths described in 1933
Mictocommosis
Moths of Africa